Tour of Virginia was a men's road bicycle racing stage race held annually in Virginia from 2003 to 2007. In 2007, the Tour was renamed from the Tour of Shenandoah. The race was part of USA Cycling National Racing Calendar.

Past winners
 2007: Javier Zapata, Caico
 2006: Brent Bookwalter, 
 2005: Roman Kilun, 
 2004: Scottie Weiss, Subway-GoMart
 2003: Scottie Weiss, Subway-GoMart

External links

Recurring sporting events established in 2003
2003 establishments in Virginia
Cycle races in the United States
Sports in Virginia
Men's road bicycle races
Recurring sporting events disestablished in 2007
Defunct cycling races in the United States
2007 disestablishments in Virginia